Admiral Sir William Eric Campbell Tait  (12 August 1886 – 17 July 1946) was a senior British naval officer, courtier and the fifth Governor of Southern Rhodesia after his naval retirement in 1944, serving from 1945 to 1946.

He commanded various cruisers between 1928 and 1937. He became Commander-in-Chief, South Atlantic in 1942.

Naval career
Born in Morice Town, Devon to Deputy Surgeon-General and author, William Tait, and his wife Emma, Tait entered the Britannia Royal Naval College in Dartmouth in 1902. Following his graduation, Tait became a career naval officer, serving in the Pacific, Atlantic, Mediterranean and China. He became a friend of the royal household of King George V, serving as a mentor to his two oldest sons, the future kings Edward VIII and George VI.

After serving in World War I, during which he was made a Member of the Royal Victorian Order (MVO), Tait married Katie Grenfell, daughter of Captain Hubert Grenfell, inventor of illuminated night sights for naval guns, on 3 November 1919. They had two daughters. Under the name Cynthia Tait (1894–1962) his wife became a well-known botanical illustrator, particularly of South African flowers.

Made Rear Admiral, Tait was Naval Aide-de-camp to King George VI in 1938, a Companion of the Order of the Bath (CB) in 1940 and Vice Admiral in 1941. before becoming Commodore of the principal naval depot at Portsmouth. It was in this position that Tait was recognised for the smooth mobilisation of the fleet at outbreak of World War II. After serving as Director of Personal Services at the Admiralty, Tait served as Commander-in-Chief, South Atlantic from 1942, and in this capacity, he established and headed a Combined Headquarters in Cape Town, where he led the Royal Navy, South African Army and South African Air Force, which was considered an important factor in maintaining allied domination around the Cape.

Tait was made a Knight Commander of the Order of the Bath (KCB) in 1943 and a Grand Officer of the Order of Orange-Nassau 1945 and was appointed Governor of Southern Rhodesia on 20 February 1945. Tait's tenure as Governor proved to be fleeting as, ailing for some time, Tait relinquished the Governorship in February 1946 after twelve months and died at Government House, Salisbury, five months later, less than a month before his 60th birthday.

There is an Admiral Tait Primary School in Harare, Zimbabwe, named in honour of Tait.

References

|-
 

Royal Navy admirals
Graduates of Britannia Royal Naval College
Governors of Southern Rhodesia
1886 births
1946 deaths
Knights Commander of the Order of the Bath
Members of the Royal Victorian Order
Grand Officers of the Order of Orange-Nassau
Royal Navy officers of World War I
Royal Navy officers of World War II
Military personnel from Plymouth, Devon